Michael Jude Pate is an American state court judge from Alaska, who has been appointed to be a justice of the Alaska Supreme Court.

Early life and education 

Pate was born in Nuremberg, Germany while his father was stationed in the U.S. Army, he spent his childhood primarily in the Netherlands and Kansas. He attended AFCENT High School in the  Netherlands. He received a Bachelor of Science in journalism from the University of Kansas and a Juris Doctor from Lewis & Clark Law School.

Career 

From 1994 to 1999, Pate served as trial counsel for the Sitka Tribe of Alaska. From 1999 to 2006, he was in private practice and from 2006 to 2018 he was an assistant public defender. In February 2018, Governor Bill Walker appointed Pate as a judge of the Sitka superior court, to replace retiring Judge David George. He was sworn in on June 1, 2018.

Nomination to Alaska Supreme Court 

On January 20, 2023, Governor Mike Dunleavy announced the appointment of Pate to the Alaska Supreme Court to fill the upcoming vacancy made by the mandatory retirement of Chief Justice Daniel Winfree. With his appointment, Pate is the first justice to come from someplace other than Juneau, Anchorage or Fairbanks since 1960.

Affiliations 

Since 2010, Pate has coached the Sitka High School mock trials, been a member of the Judicial Conference Planning Committee since 2020 and a member of the Fairness, Diversity, and Equality Committee since 2018.

References 

Living people
Year of birth missing (living people)
20th-century American lawyers
21st-century American judges
21st-century American lawyers
Alaska lawyers
Alaska state court judges
German emigrants to the United States
Lewis & Clark Law School alumni
People from Nuremberg
People from Sitka, Alaska
Public defenders
University of Kansas alumni